Joaquim António Portugal Baptista de Almeida (born 15 March 1957) is a Portuguese actor, who has appeared in more than 100 film and television roles. After doing some theater, Almeida began acting during the 1980s, appearing in films such as The Soldier (1982), The Honorary Consul (1983), Good Morning, Babylon (1987) and Milan noir (1988).

Almeida achieved international fame with his portrayals of Félix Cortez in the Phillip Noyce's thriller Clear and Present Danger (1994), drug kingpin Bucho in Desperado (1995), Ramon Salazar on the Fox thriller drama series 24 (2003–04) and Hernan Reyes in the 2011 street racing action film Fast Five. Some of his other well-known films are Only You (1994), The Mask of Zorro (1998), Behind Enemy Lines (2001), The Celestine Prophecy (2006), The Death and Life of Bobby Z (2007), Che: Part Two (2008) and The Burning Plain (2008).

Almeida has received multiple international awards and nominations for his notable roles in Retrato de Família (1992), Adão e Eva (1995), Sostiene Pereira (1997), Tentação (1998), O Xangô de Baker Street (2002), 24 (2003–04) and Óscar. Una pasión surrealista (2008).

Film

Filmography

Box office grosses

Television
Joaquim de Almeida has also worked on TV series, his first appearance was in Miami Vice, a season 2 episode, where he played a character named Roberto 'Nico' Arroyo. But his most notable work was on the television series 24. He made twelve appearances in season 3 as one of the main villains, named Ramon Salazar, a Mexican narcoterrorist, who runs one of the largest drug smuggling rings in Mexico, and is also involved in drugs for arms sales. He made part of the set who was nominated for the 2005 Actors Guild Award for best Outstanding Performance by an Ensemble in a Drama Series.

Almeida also made appearances in several American series such as the adventure drama Crusoe playing Santos Santana in 3 Episodes, the police procedural CSI: Miami as Joseph Trevi on the season 5 episode "Man Down", the comedy-drama Parenthood appearing in 2 episodes as Matthew Biscali and he also appear in 7 episodes of the 2005 police drama Wanted. Even doing all this works, Joaquim de Almeida doesn't like starring in TV series.

TV series appearances

Made-for-television films

Voice acting

Joaquim de Almeida has also provided his voice for a number of video games and animated series and films. In 1997, he appeared in Estória do Gato e da Lua , an animated short film in which he voiced The Cat. In 2004, in the Season 1 episode "Traction", of The Batman animated series, he voiced the role of the villain Bane, an elusive soldier of fortune hired by several crime lords to take out the Batman. It was Bane's only appearance in the series. Later in 2004, Almeida voiced a character named Mattson in the video game The Chronicles of Riddick: Escape from Butcher Bay,

In 2006, Almeida provides the voice of Hector Lopez in the 2006 sandbox-style action-adventure video game Saints Row. Hector Lopez is the current jefe of Los Carnales, a Latin-American gang. In the same year, he voiced Tai Lung from the Portuguese version of Kung Fu Panda.

Film

Television

Video games

References 
 General

 
 
 
 

 Specific

External links 
 

de Almeida, Joaquim
de Almeida, Joaquim